The 1826 New York gubernatorial election was held from November 6 to 8, 1826, to elect the governor and the lieutenant governor.

Candidates
The Clintonian faction of the Democratic-Republican Party nominated incumbent DeWitt Clinton for governor and Henry Huntington for lieutenant governor.

The anti-Clintonian faction of the Democratic-Republican Party nominated former U.S. representative and Judge of the Eighth Circuit Court William B. Rochester for governor and former U.S. representative Nathaniel Pitcher for lieutenant governor.

Results
Incumbent governor DeWitt Clinton was elected to a second term as governor, and Nathaniel Pitcher, the candidate of the anti-Clintonian faction, was elected lieutenant governor.

Sources
Result: The Tribune Almanac 1841

1826
New York
Gubernatorial election
November 1826 events